This is a list of significant earthquakes that either had their epicentres in Venezuela or had a significant impact in the country. Overall, the population in this region resides in structures that are vulnerable to earthquake shaking, though resistant structures exist. The predominant vulnerable building types are unreinforced brick masonry and adobe block construction.

Earthquakes

See also
Geology of Venezuela
Lists of earthquakes

References

Betancourt Ruiz, Armando. (1972). Terremotos y Temblores. Monte Ávila Caracas – Venezuela.

Venezuela
Geology of Venezuela
Earthquakes
 List
Earthquakes